Alexis Gallice (born 24 October 1976, in Bordeaux, France) is son, grandson and nephew of professional and international footballers, Jean Gallice, André Gallice and René Gallice (Girondins de Bordeaux). Having also opted for football, he evolved to the semi-professional level in France with the Pau FC and both professional and amateur level in the United States in the Premier Development League with the Bakersfield Brigade or in the National Premier Soccer League with the New Jersey Blaze.

As an entrepreneur, he created Béarn Initiatives Environment (IBE), an association of environmental initiatives in 2001, CIALFI agency Council for Sport and Sustainable Development in 2009, and the French Soccer Institute (FSI) in 2012.
In 2004 and 2008 he was involved in the Global Forum for Sport and Environment (G-ForSE) and the International Summit on Sport and Environment Programme United Nations Environment Programme.

References

1976 births
Bakersfield Brigade players
French footballers
Living people
Association footballers not categorized by position